Jan Tichy (1974) is a Chicago-based artist and educator, born in Czechoslovakia.

Biography 
Jan Tichy is a contemporary artist and educator working in video, sculpture, architecture, and photography. Born in Prague in 1974, Tichy studied art in Israel before moving to Chicago.

Education 
Tichy studied at the Musrara School of Photography and New Media in Jerusalem and at the Advanced Studies in Fine Art and Photography program at the Bezalel Academy of Art and Design in Tel Aviv. He earned his MFA from the School of the Art Institute of Chicago where he is now Assistant Professor at the Department of Photography.

Solo exhibitions 
 2019
Weight of Light, Museum Bensheim, Germany

 2014	
aroundcenter, Chicago Cultural Center

 2013	
Politics of Light, No Longer Empty & Richard Gray Gallery, NYC;  
Overlap, Hezi Cohen Gallery, Tel Aviv;  
Jan Tichy, Helen Day Art Center, Stowe, WA

 2012	
MATRIX 164, Wadsworth Atheneum, Hartford, CT;
1979:1-2012:21, Museum of Contemporary Photography;  
Project Cabrini Green, Gordon Gallery, Tel Aviv

! 2011	
Installation No.13, Nathan Gottesdiener Prize, Tel Aviv Museum of Art;

 2010	
01:37:24:05, Center for Contemporary Art, Tel Aviv;  
Installation No. 10, Spertus Museum, Chicago

 2009	
Installations, Richard Gray Gallery, Chicago;  
Recent Works, Museum of Contemporary Art, Bat Yam, Israel

 2008	
12*12, Museum of Contemporary Art, Chicago

 2007	
1391, Herzliya Museum of Contemporary Art

 2004	
Beton, Morel Derfler Gallery, Jerusalem

Public collections 
 Museum of Modern Art

 MAGASIN III

 Museum of Contemporary Photography

 Indianapolis Museum of Art

 Israel Museum Jerusalem

Awards and Prizes 

2012	  Faculty Enrichment	Grant, The School of the Art Institute of Chicago

2011	  Gold Award in	the Council for	Advancement and Support of Education

2010	  Nathan Gottesdiener Foundation, The Israeli Art Prize

2009  MFA Fellowship Award, The School	of the Art Institute of Chicago

2008	  America-Israel Cultural Foundation	 Scholarship

External links 
 Jan Tichy
 

Living people
1974 births
Israeli installation artists